Shaftesbury School is a coeducational secondary day and boarding school located in Shaftesbury in the English county of Dorset.

Previously a voluntary controlled Church of England school administered by the Diocese of Salisbury and Dorset County Council, The school converted to academy status under the Diocese of Salisbury in June 2014. The origins of the school date back to 1718 when the original ‘Blue Coat School’ was founded in Shaftesbury, and the school has offered boarding since 1898. It is one of only thirty-nine state boarding schools in England.

The school currently has around a thousand students who each belong to one of four houses. Melbury (Green), Duncliffe (Red), Hambledon (Blue) and Gold (Yellow). The boarding house underwent a £3 million refurbishment and expansion in 2012 and now has over one hundred students from around the world.

Shaftesbury School offers GCSEs,  and BTECs as programmes of study for pupils. Shaftesbury School's sixth form provision has links to Sturminster Newton High School in Sturminster Newton, and students in the sixth form have the option to study from a range of A Levels and further BTECs on two sites.

See also 
List of English and Welsh endowed schools (19th century)

References

External links
Shaftesbury School official website

Educational institutions established in 1718
1718 establishments in England
Secondary schools in Dorset
Church of England secondary schools in the Diocese of Salisbury
Boarding schools in Dorset
Academies in Dorset
Shaftesbury